Wiltrud Urselmann (born 12 May 1942) is a German former breaststroke swimmer. In 1957 she was named the German Sportspersonality of the Year for her national achievements. She then won a bronze medal in the 200 m breaststroke at the 1958 European Aquatics Championships. On 6 June 1960 she set a new world record in the same event (02:50.2), beating the previous record of Anita Lonsbrough. Two months later, in the 1960 Summer Olympics finals, she swam even faster (2:50.0), but was beaten in the last 25 meters by Lonsbrough (2:49.5).

Urselmann also competed at the 1964 Summer Olympics but with a time of 2:53.2 failed to reach the finals.

References

1942 births
Living people
German female swimmers
Female breaststroke swimmers
Olympic swimmers of the United Team of Germany
Swimmers at the 1960 Summer Olympics
Swimmers at the 1964 Summer Olympics
Olympic silver medalists for the United Team of Germany
Sportspeople from Krefeld
European Aquatics Championships medalists in swimming
Medalists at the 1960 Summer Olympics
Olympic silver medalists in swimming